Alexander Russo may refer to:

 Alexander Russo (writer), education writer
 Alexander Russo (athlete) (born 1994), Brazilian track and field sprinter